Free Somehow is the tenth studio album by the Athens, Georgia-based band Widespread Panic. It was recorded in May 2007 with Terry Manning producing in Nassau, Bahamas at the Compass Point Studios. The album is being offered in three variations; a regular CD release, a digital release, and a vinyl record release (April 14, 2008).  It was the band's first studio album featuring guitarist Jimmy Herring who joined in 2006.

Track listing
"Boom Boom Boom" (Jerry Joseph / Widespread Panic) 4:25
"Walk On The Flood" (Widespread Panic) 6:53
"Angels On High" (Terry Manning / Widespread Panic) 7:13
"Three Candles" (Widespread Panic) 5:00
"Tickle the Truth" (Widespread Panic) 5:15
"Free Somehow" (Widespread Panic) 4:43
"Flicker" (Jerry Joseph / Widespread Panic) 4:57
"Dark Day Program" (Jerry Joseph / Widespread Panic) 5:57
"Her Dance Needs No Body" (Terry Manning / Widespread Panic) 8:19
"Already Fried" (Widespread Panic) 3:36
"Up All Night" (Widespread Panic) 3:46

Personnel
Widespread Panic
John Bell – guitar, vocals
John Hermann – keyboards
Jimmy Herring – guitars
Todd Nance – drums
Domingo S. Ortiz – percussion
Dave Schools – bass

Guest performers
Horns on "Angels On High", "Dark Day Program", "Her Dance Needs No Body" – The Compass Point Horns:
Trumpet & Flugelhorn – Jawara Adams
Saxophone – Tino Richardson
Valve Trombone – Terry Manning
Horns on "Up All Night": 
Trumpet – Rookie Fisher
Baritone Sax – Joel Johanson
Tenor Sax – Charlie Chalmers
Valve Trombone – Terry Manning
Orchestral strings and woodwinds – The Compass Point Orchestra
Horn and string arrangements, additional harmony vocals, cello and harmonica – Terry Manning
Fiddle on "Free Somehow" – Bruce Hoffman
Backing vocals on "Up All Night" & "Free Somehow" – Sandra Rhodes, Brenda Barnett, Charlie Chalmers
Backing vocals on "Boom Boom Boom" – Everybody

Personnel
Terry Manning – Producer, Engineer, Mastering
Chris Bilheimer – Art Direction & Design

Equipment
Widespread Panic uses:
Sabian cymbals
Vic Firth sticks and mallets
Goff Professional Hammond organ
Evans & Remo drumheads
D'Addario strings
Jimmy plays PRS guitars
Dave plays Modulus Graphite basses equipped GHS strings through Ampeg cabinets and amplifiers
Domingo uses Latin Percussion instruments
Todd uses DW drums, pedals & hardware
John bends Washburn guitars

Charts

External links
Widespread Panic website

2008 albums
Widespread Panic albums
Albums produced by Terry Manning